Emmanuel Hammond (born 9 February 1997) is a Ghanaian footballer who plays as a forward for Ghanaian Division One League side Heart Of Lions.

Club career

Early career
Emmanuel began his football career with a youth club Mighty Victory in Accra. Emmanuel later moved to Heart Of Lions in Kpando. He stayed at Heart Of Lions for 3 season and later joined Ghana Premier League side Inter Allies.

Inter Allies
In May 2018, Emmanuel signed to Ghana Premier League club Inter Allies on a three-year deal

Hearts Of lions
In October 2020, Emmanuel signed to Heart Of Lions on loan.

References

External links
 

Living people
1997 births
Ghanaian footballers
Association football forwards
Heart of Lions F.C. players
International Allies F.C. players